Neohesperilla senta, the senta skipper, is a butterfly of the family Hesperiidae. It is found across the tropical north of Australia, including Western Australia, the Northern Territory and Queensland.

The wingspan is about 25 mm.

The larvae feed on Themeda triandra.

External links
 Australian Caterpillars

Trapezitinae
Butterflies described in 1891
Butterflies of Australia